Vanessa Carolina Coello Coraspe (born September 1, 1995) is a Venezuelan model who was crowned Miss Grand Venezuela 2021. Coello also represented the state of Monagas at the Miss Venezuela 2019 competition, managing to obtain fourth place, qualifying as 2nd Runner-Up.

In 2021, she represented Venezuela at the  pageant where she placed in Top 10.

Modeling

Coello has worked as a model in Spain, Turkey and Italy.

Pageantry

Miss Venezuela 2019
Coello began her pageantry career representing her home state, Monagas, this time in Miss Venezuela 2019 pageant at the Estudio 1 de Venevisión in Caracas on August 1, 2019. Vanessa competed with 23 other candidates for the disputed crown, becoming one of the greats favorites of that edition. She placed as the 2nd Runner-Up and lost to eventual winner Thalía Olvino of Delta Amacuro as the new Miss Universe Venezuela 2019.

Miss Grand Venezuela 2021
After a selection process, in which 6 finalists were chosen and among those who were, (Gabriela de la Cruz, Miss Supranational Venezuela 2019 and 4th Runner-Up in Miss Supranational 2019; Lisandra Chirinos, Miss Portuguesa 2020 and Top 10 in Miss Venezuela 2020; María José Duque, Top 5 in Miss Venezuela World 2015; Jhosskaren Carrizo, Miss Lara 2020 and Top 10 in Miss Venezuela 2020; and Samira Boutros), Vanessa was selected as the new Miss Grand Venezuela. For this process, social networks, mainly Instagram, were taken into consideration for the final choice of the chosen one.

Finally, on August 24, 2021, Coello was titled Miss Grand Venezuela 2021, being crowned by Valentina Figuera; thus succeeding Eliana Roa as Miss Grand Venezuela. Coello could not be crowned by Roa, since she was based in Turkey at the time of the coronation.

Miss Grand International 2021 
As Miss Grand Venezuela, Coello represented Venezuela at the Miss Grand International 2021 pageant, which was take place on December 4, 2021 in Phuket, Thailand and she placed in Top 10.

References

External links

1995 births
Living people
Venezuelan female models
Venezuelan beauty pageant winners
Miss Venezuela winners
People from Maturín
Miss Grand International contestants